The Republic of Venice or Venetian Republic, traditionally known as La Serenissima, was a sovereign state and maritime republic in parts of present-day Italy (mainly northeastern Italy) that existed for 1100 years from AD 697 until AD 1797. Centered on the lagoon communities of the prosperous city of Venice, it incorporated numerous overseas possessions in modern Croatia, Slovenia, Montenegro, Greece, Albania and Cyprus. The republic grew into a trading power during the Middle Ages and strengthened this position during the Renaissance. Citizens spoke the still-surviving Venetian language, although publishing in (Florentine) Italian became the norm during the Renaissance.

In its early years, it prospered on the salt trade. In subsequent centuries, the city state established a thalassocracy. It dominated trade on the Mediterranean Sea, including commerce between Europe and North Africa, as well as Asia. The Venetian navy was used in the Crusades, most notably in the Fourth Crusade. However, Venice perceived Rome as an enemy and maintained high levels of religious and ideological independence personified by the patriarch of Venice and a highly developed independent publishing industry that served as a haven from Catholic censorship for many centuries. Venice achieved territorial conquests along the Adriatic Sea. It became home to an extremely wealthy merchant class, who patronised renowned art and architecture along the city's lagoons. Venetian merchants were influential financiers in Europe. The city was also the birthplace of great European explorers, such as Marco Polo, as well as Baroque composers such as Antonio Vivaldi and Benedetto Marcello and famous painters such as the Renaissance master Titian.

The republic was ruled by the doge, who was elected by members of the Great Council of Venice, the city-state's parliament, and ruled for life. The ruling class was an oligarchy of merchants and aristocrats. Venice and other Italian maritime republics played a key role in fostering capitalism. Venetian citizens generally supported the system of governance. The city-state enforced strict laws and employed ruthless tactics in its prisons.

The opening of new trade routes to the Americas and the East Indies via the Atlantic Ocean marked the beginning of Venice's decline as a powerful maritime republic. The city state suffered defeats from the navy of the Ottoman Empire. In 1797, the republic was plundered by retreating Austrian and then French forces, following an invasion by Napoleon Bonaparte, and the Republic of Venice was split into the Austrian Venetian Province, the Cisalpine Republic, a French client state, and the Ionian French departments of Greece. Venice as well as the whole of Veneto would become part of a unified Italy in the 19th century following the Kingdom of Italy's victory against Austria in The Third War of Italian Independence.

Etymology
During its long history, the Republic of Venice took on various names, all closely linked to the titles attributed to the doge. During the eighth century, when Venice still depended on the Byzantine Empire, the doge was called Dux Venetiarum Provinciae (English: Doge of the Province of Venice), and then, starting from 840, Dux Veneticorum (English: Doge of the Venetians), following the signing of the Pactum Lotharii. This commercial agreement, stipulated between the Duchy of Venice (Latin: Ducatum Venetiae) and the Carolingian Empire, de facto ratified the independence of Venice from the Byzantine Empire.

In the following century, references to Venice as a Byzantine dominion disappeared, and in a document from 976 there is a mention of the most glorious Domino Venetiarum (English: Lord of Venice), where the 'most glorious' appellative had already been used for the first time in the Pactum Lotharii and where the appellative "Lord" refers to the fact that the doge was still considered like a king, even if elected by the popular assembly. Gaining independence, Venice also began to expand on the coasts of the Adriatic Sea and so starting from 1109, following the conquest of Dalmatia and the Croatian coast, the doge formally received the title of Venetiae Dalmatiae atque Chroatiae Dux (English: Doge of Venice, Dalmatia and Croatia), a name that continued to be used until the eighteenth century. Starting from the 15th century, the documents written in Latin were joined by those in the Venetian language and in parallel with the events in Italy, the Duchy of Venice also changed its name, now becoming the Lordship of Venice, which as written in the peace treaty of 1453 with Sultan Mehmed II was fully named the lIlustrissima et Excellentissima deta Signoria de Venexia (English: The Most Illustrious and Excellent Signoria of Venice).

During the seventeenth century, monarchical absolutism asserted itself in many countries of continental Europe, radically changing the European political landscape. This change made it possible to more markedly determine the differences between monarchies and republics: while the former were economies governed by strict laws and dominated by agriculture, the latter lived thanks to commercial affairs and free markets. Moreover, the monarchies, in addition to being led by a single ruling family, were more prone to war and religious uniformity. This increasingly noticeable difference between monarchy and republic began to be specified also in official documents and it was hence that names such as the Republic of Genoa or the Republic of the Seven United Provinces were born. The Lordship of Venice also adapted to this new terminology, becoming the Most Serene Republic of Venice, a name by which it is best known today. Similarly, the doge was also given the nickname of serenissimo or more simply that of His Serenity. From the seventeenth century the Republic of Venice took on other more or less official names such as the Venetian State or the Venetian Republic.

The Republic is often referred to as La Serenissima, in reference to its title as one of the "Most Serene Republics".

History

During the 5th century, northeast Italy was devastated by the Germanic barbarian invasions. A large number of the inhabitants moved to the coastal lagoons, looking for a safer place to live.

At some point in the first decades of the eighth century, the people of the Byzantine province of Venice elected their first leader Ursus (or Orso Ipato), who was confirmed by Constantinople and given the titles of hypatus and dux. He was the first historical Doge of Venice. Tradition, however, first attested in the early 11th century, states that the Venetians first proclaimed one Anafestus Paulicius duke in 697, though this story dates to no earlier than the chronicle of John the Deacon. Whichever the case, the first doges had their power base in Heraclea.

Rise

Ursus's successor, Deusdedit, moved his seat from Heraclea to Malamocco in the 740s. He was the son of Ursus and represented the attempt of his father to establish a dynasty. Such attempts were commonplace among the doges of the first few centuries of Venetian history, but all were ultimately unsuccessful. During the reign of Deusdedit, Venice became the only remaining Byzantine possession in the north, and the changing politics of the Frankish Empire began to change the factional divisions within Venetia.

One faction was decidedly pro-Byzantine. They desired to remain well connected to the Empire. Another faction, republican in nature, believed in continuing along a course towards practical independence. The other main faction was pro-Frankish. Supported mostly by clergy (in line with papal sympathies of the time), they looked towards the new Carolingian king of the Franks, Pepin the Short, as the best provider of defence against the Lombards. A minor, pro-Lombard faction was opposed to close ties with any of these further-off powers and interested in maintaining peace with the neighbouring (and surrounding, but for the sea) Lombard kingdom.

In that period, Venice had established for itself a thriving slave trade, buying in Italy, among other places, and selling to the Moors in Northern Africa (Pope Zachary himself reportedly forbade such traffic out of Rome). When the sale of Christians to Muslims was banned following the pactum Lotharii, the Venetians began to sell Slavs and other Eastern European non-Christian slaves in greater numbers. Caravans of slaves traveled from Eastern Europe, through Alpine passes in Austria, to reach Venice. Eunuchs were especially valuable, and "castration houses" arose in Venice, as well as other prominent slave markets, to meet this demand. Indeed, Venice was far from the only Italian city engaged in the slave trade in Medieval Europe.

Early Middle Ages

The successors of Obelerio inherited a united Venice. By the Pax Nicephori (803–814), the two emperors had recognised that Venice belonged to the Byzantine sphere of influence. Many centuries later, the Venetians claimed that the treaty had recognised Venetian de facto independence, but the truth of this claim is doubted by modern scholars. A Byzantine fleet sailed to Venice in 807 and deposed the Doge, replacing him with a Byzantine governor. Nevertheless, during the reign of the Participazio family, Venice grew into its modern form.

Though Heraclean by birth, Agnello, the first Participazio doge, was an early immigrant to Rialto and his dogeship was marked by the expansion of Venice towards the sea via the construction of bridges, canals, bulwarks, fortifications, and stone buildings. The modern Venice, at one with the sea, was being born. Agnello was succeeded by his son Giustiniano, who stole the remains of Saint Mark the Evangelist from Alexandria, took them to Venice, and made him the republic's patron saint. According to tradition, Saint Mark was the founder of the Patriarchate of Aquileia.

With the patriarch's flight to Grado after the Lombard invasion, the patriarchate split into two: one on the mainland, under the control of the Lombards and later the Franks, and the other in Grado on the lagoons and the areas under Byzantine control. This would later become the Patriarchate of Venice. With the apostle's reliquiae in its hands, Venice could again claim to be the rightful heir of Aquileia. In the Late Middle Ages, this would be the basis for legitimizing the seizure of the patriarchy's vast territories in Friuli and eastwards.

During the reign of the successor of the Participazio, Pietro Tradonico, Venice began to establish its military might, which would influence many a later crusade and dominate the Adriatic for centuries. Tradonico secured the sea by fighting Narentine and Saracen pirates. Tradonico's reign was long and successful (837–64), but he was succeeded by the Participazio and a dynasty appeared to have been finally established. Around 841, the Republic of Venice sent a fleet of 60 galleys (each carrying 200 men) to assist the Byzantines in driving the Arabs from Crotone, but it failed. In 1000, Pietro II Orseolo sent a fleet of 6 ships to defeat the Narentine pirates from Dalmatia.

High Middle Ages

In the High Middle Ages, Venice became extremely wealthy through its control of trade between Europe and the Levant, and it began to expand into the Adriatic Sea and beyond. In 1084, Domenico Selvo personally led a fleet against the Normans, but he was defeated and lost nine great galleys, the largest and most heavily armed ships in the Venetian war fleet. Venice was involved in the Crusades almost from the very beginning. Two hundred Venetian ships assisted in capturing the coastal cities of Syria after the First Crusade. In 1110, Ordelafo Faliero personally commanded a Venetian fleet of 100 ships to assist Baldwin I of Jerusalem and Sigurd I Magnusson, king of Norway in capturing the city of Sidon (in present-day Lebanon). In 1123, they were granted virtual autonomy in the Kingdom of Jerusalem through the Pactum Warmundi.

The Venetians also gained extensive trading privileges in the Byzantine Empire during the 12th century, and their ships often provided the Empire with a navy. In 1182, a vicious anti-Western riot broke out in Constantinople targeting Latins, and Venetians in particular. Many in the Empire had become jealous of Venetian power and influence, thus when the pretender Andronikos I Komnenos marched on the city, Venetian property was seized and the owners imprisoned or banished, an act which humiliated and angered the republic.

In 1183, the city of Zara successfully rebelled against Venetian rule. The city then put itself under the dual protection of the papacy and Emeric, King of Hungary. The Dalmatians separated from Hungary by a treaty in 1199, and they paid Hungary with a portion of Macedonia. In 1201, the city of Zara recognized Emeric as overlord.

The leaders of the Fourth Crusade (1202–04) contracted with Venice to provide a fleet for transportation to the Levant. When the crusaders were unable to pay for the ships, Doge Enrico Dandolo offered transport if the crusaders were to capture Zara, a city that had rebelled years ago and was a rival to Venice. Upon the capture of Zara, the crusade was again diverted, this time to Constantinople. The capture and sacking of Constantinople has been described as one of the most profitable and disgraceful sacks of a city in history.

The Venetians claimed much of the plunder, including the famous four bronze horses that were brought back to adorn St Mark's Basilica. Furthermore, in the subsequent partition of the Byzantine lands, Venice gained a great deal of territory in the Aegean Sea, theoretically amounting to three-eighths of the Byzantine Empire. It also acquired the islands of Crete (Candia) and Euboea (Negroponte); the present core city of Chania on Crete is largely of Venetian construction, built atop the ruins of the ancient city of Cydonia.

The Aegean islands came to form the Venetian Duchy of the Archipelago. In ca. 1223/24, the then-lord of Philippopolis, Gerard of Estreux declared himself prepared to acknowledge the suzerainty of the Republic of Venice over a part of his possessions. The Byzantine Empire was re-established in 1261 by Michael VIII Palaiologos, but never again recovered its previous power, and was eventually conquered by the Ottoman Turks.

The Republic of Venice fought the War of the Castle of Love against Padua and Treviso in 1215. It signed a trade treaty with the Mongol Empire in 1221.

In 1295, Pietro Gradenigo sent a fleet of 68 ships to attack a Genoese fleet at Alexandretta, then another fleet of 100 ships was sent to attack the Genoese in 1299. The Serrata del Maggior Consiglio (Great Council Lockout) refers to the constitutional process, started with the 1297 Ordinance, by means of which membership of the Great Council of Venice became an hereditary title. Since it was the Great Council that had the right to elect the Doge, the 1297 Ordinance marked a relevant change in the constitution of the Republic. This resulted in the exclusion of minor aristocrats and plebeian from participating in the government of the Republic.

14th century

The Holy League of 1332 was a military alliance of the chief Christian states of the Aegean Sea and the Eastern Mediterranean against the mounting threat of naval raids by the Turkish beyliks of Anatolia. The alliance was spearheaded by the main regional naval powers Venice and the Knights Hospitaller and included the Kingdom of Cyprus and the Byzantine Empire while other states also promised support. After a notable success in the Battle of Adramyttion, commanded by the venetian Pietro Zeno, the Turkish naval threat receded for a while. Coupled with the diverging interests of its members the league atrophied and ended in 1336/7.
 
From 1350 to 1381, Venice fought an intermittent war with the Genoese. Initially defeated, they devastated the Genoese fleet at the War of Chioggia in 1379–1381 and retained their prominent position in eastern Mediterranean affairs at the expense of Genoa's declining empire. In 1363, the revolt of Saint Titus against Venetian rule broke out in the overseas colony of Candia (Crete). It was a joint effort of Venetian colonists and Cretan nobles who attempted to create an independent state. Venice sent a multinational mercenary army which soon regained control of the major cities. However, Venice was not able to fully reconquer Crete until 1368.

By the end of the 14th century, Venice had acquired mainland possessions in Italy, annexing Mestre and Serravalle in 1337, Treviso and Bassano del Grappa in 1339, Oderzo in 1380, and Ceneda in 1389.

15th century: The expansion in the mainland

In 1403 the last major battle between the Genoese (now under French rule) and Venice was fought off Modon and the final victory resulted in maritime hegemony and dominance of the eastern trade routes. The latter would soon be contested, however, by the inexorable rise of the Ottoman Empire. Hostilities began after the Ottoman prince Mehmed I ended the civil war of the Ottoman Interregnum and established himself as Sultan. The conflict escalated until Pietro Loredan won a crushing victory against the Turks off Gallipoli in 1416.

Venice expanded as well along the Dalmatian coast from Istria to Albania, which was acquired from King Ladislaus of Naples during the civil war in Hungary. Ladislaus was about to lose the conflict and had decided to escape to Naples, but before doing so, he agreed to sell his now practically forfeit rights on the Dalmatian cities for the reduced sum of 100,000 ducats. Venice exploited the situation and quickly installed nobility to govern the area, for example, Count Filippo Stipanov in Zara. This move by the Venetians was a response to the threatening expansion of Giangaleazzo Visconti, Duke of Milan. Control over the northeast main land routes was also a necessity for the safety of the trades. By 1410, Venice had a navy of 3,300 ships (manned by 36,000 men) and taken over most of what is now the Veneto, including the cities of Verona (which swore its loyalty in the Devotion of Verona to Venice in 1405) and Padua.
In the early 15th century, the republic began to expand onto the Terraferma. Thus, Vicenza, Belluno, and Feltre were acquired in 1404, and Padua, Verona, and Este in 1405.

The situation in Dalmatia had been settled in 1408 by a truce with King Sigismund of Hungary, but the difficulties of Hungary finally granted to the republic the consolidation of its Adriatic dominions. At the expiration of the truce in 1420, Venice immediately invaded the Patriarchate of Aquileia, and subjected Traù, Spalato, Durazzo, and other Dalmatian cities. In Lombardy, Venice acquired Brescia in 1426, Bergamo in 1428, and Cremona in 1499.

Slaves were plentiful in the Italian city-states as late as the 15th century. Between 1414 and 1423, some 10,000 slaves, imported from Caffa, were sold in Venice.

In 1454, a conspiracy for a planned rebellion against Venice was dismantled in Candia. The conspiracy was led by Sifis Vlastos as an opposition to the religious reforms for the unification of Churches agreed at the Council of Florence.

In 1481, Venice retook nearby Rovigo, which it had held previously from 1395 to 1438; in February 1489, the island of Cyprus, previously a crusader state (the Kingdom of Cyprus), was added to Venice's holdings.

16th century: League of Cambrai, the loss of Cyprus, and Battle of Lepanto

The Ottoman Empire started sea campaigns as early as 1423, when it waged a seven-year war with the Venetian Republic over maritime control of the Aegean, the Ionian, and the Adriatic Seas. The wars with Venice resumed after the Ottomans captured the Kingdom of Bosnia in 1463, and lasted until a favorable peace treaty was signed in 1479 just after the troublesome siege of Shkodra. In 1480 (now no longer hampered by the Venetian fleet), the Ottomans besieged Rhodes and briefly captured Otranto. By 1490, the population of Venice had risen to about 180,000 people.

War with the Ottomans resumed from 1499 to 1503. In 1499, Venice allied itself with Louis XII of France against Milan, gaining Cremona. In the same year, the Ottoman sultan moved to attack Lepanto by land, and sent a large fleet to support his offensive by sea. Antonio Grimani, more a businessman and diplomat than a sailor, was defeated in the sea battle of Zonchio in 1499. The Turks once again sacked Friuli. Preferring peace to total war both against the Turks and by sea, Venice surrendered the bases of Lepanto, Durazzo, Modon, and Coron.

Venice's attention was diverted from its usual maritime position by the delicate situation in Romagna, then one of the richest lands in Italy, which was nominally part of the Papal States, but effectively divided into a series of small lordships which were difficult for Rome's troops to control. Eager to take some of Venice's lands, all neighbouring powers joined in the League of Cambrai in 1508, under the leadership of Pope Julius II. The pope wanted Romagna; Emperor Maximilian I: Friuli and Veneto; Spain: the Apulian ports; the king of France: Cremona; the king of Hungary: Dalmatia, and each one some of another's part. The offensive against the huge army enlisted by Venice was launched from France.

On 14 May 1509, Venice was crushingly defeated at the battle of Agnadello, in the Ghiara d'Adda, marking one of the most delicate points in Venetian history. French and imperial troops were occupying Veneto, but Venice managed to extricate itself through diplomatic efforts. The Apulian ports were ceded in order to come to terms with Spain, and Pope Julius II soon recognized the danger brought by the eventual destruction of Venice (then the only Italian power able to face kingdoms like France or empires like the Ottomans).

The citizens of the mainland rose to the cry of "Marco, Marco", and Andrea Gritti recaptured Padua in July 1509, successfully defending it against the besieging imperial troops. Spain and the pope broke off their alliance with France, and Venice regained Brescia and Verona from France, also. After seven years of ruinous war, the Serenissima regained its mainland dominions west to the Adda River. Although the defeat had turned into a victory, the events of 1509 marked the end of the Venetian expansion.

In 1489, the first year of Venetian control of Cyprus, Turks attacked the Karpasia Peninsula, pillaging and taking captives to be sold into slavery. In 1539, the Turkish fleet attacked and destroyed Limassol. Fearing the ever-expanding Ottoman Empire, the Venetians had fortified Famagusta, Nicosia, and Kyrenia, but most other cities were easy prey. By 1563, the population of Venice had dropped to about 168,000 people.

In the summer of 1570, the Turks struck again, but this time with a full-scale invasion rather than a raid. About 60,000 troops, including cavalry and artillery, under the command of Mustafa Pasha landed unopposed near Limassol on 2 July 1570, and laid siege to Nicosia. In an orgy of victory on the day that the city fell – 9 September 1570 – 20,000 Nicosians were put to death, and every church, public building, and palace was looted. Word of the massacre spread, and a few days later, Mustafa took Kyrenia without having to fire a shot. Famagusta, however, resisted and put up a defense that lasted from September 1570 until August 1571.

The fall of Famagusta marked the beginning of the Ottoman period in Cyprus. Two months later, the naval forces of the Holy League, composed mainly of Venetian, Spanish, and papal ships under the command of Don John of Austria, defeated the Turkish fleet at the Battle of Lepanto. Despite victory at sea over the Turks, Cyprus remained under Ottoman rule for the next three centuries. By 1575, the population of Venice was about 175,000 people, but partly as a result of the plague of 1575–76 dropped to 124,000 people by 1581.

17th century

According to economic historian Jan De Vries, Venice's economic power in the Mediterranean had declined significantly by the start of the 17th century. De Vries attributes this decline to the loss of the spice trade, a declining uncompetitive textile industry, competition in book publishing due to a rejuvenated Catholic Church, the adverse impact of the Thirty Years' War on Venice's key trade partners, and the increasing cost of cotton and silk imports to Venice.

In 1606, a conflict between Venice and the Holy See began with the arrest of two clerics accused of petty crimes, and with a law restricting the Church's right to enjoy and acquire landed property. Pope Paul V held that these provisions were contrary to canon law, and demanded that they be repealed. When this was refused, he placed Venice under an interdict which forbade clergymen from exercising almost all priestly duties. The Republic paid no attention to the interdict or the act of excommunication, and ordered its priests to carry out their ministry. It was supported in its decisions by the Servite monk Paolo Sarpi, a sharp polemical writer who was nominated to be the Signoria's adviser on theology and canon law in 1606. The interdict was lifted after a year, when France intervened and proposed a formula of compromise. Venice was satisfied with reaffirming the principle that no citizen was superior to the normal processes of law.

Rivalry with Hapsburg Spain and the Holy Roman Empire led to Venice's last significant wars in Italy and the northern Adriatic. Between 1615 and 1618 Venice fought Archduke Ferdinand of Austria in the Uskok war in the northern Adriatic and on the Republic's eastern border, while in Lombardy, to the west, Venetian troops skirmished with the forces of Don Pedro de Toledo Osorio, Spanish governor of Milan, around Crema in 1617 and in the countryside of Romano di Lombardia in 1618. A fragile peace did not last, and in 1629 the Most Serene Republic returned to war with Spain and the Holy Roman Empire in the War of the Mantuan succession. During the brief war a Venetian army led by provveditore Zaccaria Sagredo and reinforced by French allies was disastrously routed by Imperial forces at the battle of Villabuona and Venice's closest ally Mantua was sacked, but reversals elsewhere for the Holy Roman empire and Spain ensured the Republic suffered no territorial loss and the duchy of Mantua was restored to the candidate backed by Venice and France, Charles II Gonzaga, Duke of Nevers.

The latter half of the 17th century also had prolonged wars with the Ottoman Empire; in the Cretan War (1645–1669), after a heroic siege that lasted 21 years, Venice lost its major overseas possession—the island of Crete (although it kept the control of the bases of Spinalonga and Suda)—while it made some advances in Dalmatia. In 1684, however, taking advantage of the Ottoman involvement against Austria in the Great Turkish War, the republic initiated the Morean War, which lasted until 1699 and in which it was able to conquer the Morea peninsula in southern Greece.

18th century: decline

These gains did not last, however; in December 1714, the Turks began the last Turkish–Venetian War, when the Morea was "without any of those supplies which are so desirable even in countries where aid is near at hand which are not liable to attack from the sea".

The Turks took the islands of Tinos and Aegina, crossed the isthmus, and took Corinth. Daniele Dolfin, commander of the Venetian fleet, thought it better to save the fleet than risk it for the Morea. When he eventually arrived on the scene, Nauplia, Modon, Corone, and Malvasia had fallen. Levkas in the Ionian islands, and the bases of Spinalonga and Suda on Crete, which still remained in Venetian hands, were abandoned. The Turks finally landed on Corfu, but its defenders managed to throw them back.

In the meantime, the Turks had suffered a grave defeat by the Austrians in the Battle of Petrovaradin on 5 August 1716. Venetian naval efforts in the Aegean Sea and the Dardanelles in 1717 and 1718, however, met with little success. With the Treaty of Passarowitz (21 July 1718), Austria made large territorial gains, but Venice lost the Morea, for which its small gains in Albania and Dalmatia were little compensation. This was the last war with the Ottoman Empire. By the year 1792, the once-great Venetian merchant fleet had declined to a mere 309 merchantmen.

Although Venice declined as a seaborne empire, it remained in possession of its continental domain north of the Po Valley, extending west almost to Milan. Many of its cities benefited greatly from the Pax Venetiae (Venetian peace) throughout the 18th century.

Fall

By 1796, the Republic of Venice could no longer defend itself since its war fleet numbered only four galleys and seven galliots. In spring 1796, Piedmont fell, and the Austrians were beaten from Montenotte to Lodi. The army under Bonaparte crossed the frontiers of neutral Venice in pursuit of the enemy. By the end of the year, the French troops were occupying the Venetian state up to the Adige. Vicenza, Cadore and Friuli were held by the Austrians. With the campaigns of the next year, Napoleon aimed for the Austrian possessions across the Alps. In the preliminaries to the Peace of Leoben, the terms of which remained secret, the Austrians were to take the Venetian possessions in the Balkans as the price of peace (18 April 1797) while France acquired the Lombard part of the State.

After Napoleon's ultimatum, Doge Ludovico Manin surrendered unconditionally on 12 May, and abdicated, while the Major Council declared the end of the republic. According to Bonaparte's orders, the public powers passed to a provisional municipality under the French military governor. On 17 October, France and Austria signed the Treaty of Campo Formio, agreeing to share all the territory of the ancient republic, with a new border just west of the Adige River. Italian democrats, especially young poet Ugo Foscolo, viewed the treaty as a betrayal. The metropolitan part of the disbanded republic became an Austrian territory, under the name of Venetian Province (Provincia Veneta in Italian, Provinz Venedig in German).

Legacy
 
Though the economic vitality of the Venetian Republic had started to decline since the 16th century due to the movement of international trade towards the Atlantic, its political regime still appeared in the 18th century as a model for the philosophers of the enlightenment.

Jean-Jacques Rousseau was hired in July 1743 as Secretary by comte de Montaigu, who had been named Ambassador of the French in Venice. This short experience, nevertheless, awakened the interest of Rousseau to the policy, which led him to design a large book of political philosophy. After the Discourse on the Origin and Basis of Inequality Among Men (1755), he published The Social Contract (1762).

Government

In the early years of the republic, the Doge of Venice ruled Venice in an autocratic fashion, but later his powers were limited by the promissione ducale, a pledge he had to take when elected. As a result, powers were shared with the Maggior Consiglio or Great Council, composed of 480 members taken from patrician families, so that in the words of Marin Sanudo, "[The doge] could do nothing without the Great Council and the Great Council could do nothing without him".

Venice followed a mixed government model, combining monarchy in the doge, aristocracy in the Senate, republic of Rialto families in the Great Council, and a democracy in the concio. Machiavelli considered it ''excellent among modern republics'', unlike his native republic of Florence).

In the 12th century, the aristocratic families of Rialto further diminished the doge's powers by establishing the Minor Council (1175), composed of the six ducal councillors, and the Council of Forty or Quarantia (1179) as a supreme tribunal. In 1223, these institutions were combined into the Signoria, which consisted of the doge, the Minor Council, and the three leaders of the Quarantia. The Signoria was the central body of government, representing the continuity of the republic as shown in the expression: "si è morto il Doge, no la Signoria" ("If the Doge is dead, the Signoria is not").

During the late 14th and early 15th centuries, the Signoria was supplemented by a number of boards of savii ("wise men"): the six savii del consiglio, who formulated and executed government policy; the five savii di terraferma, responsible for military affairs and the defence of the Terraferma; and the five savii ai ordini, responsible for the navy, commerce, and the overseas territories. Together, the Signoria and the savii formed the Full College (Pien Collegio), the de facto executive body of the Republic.

In 1229, the Consiglio dei Pregadi or Senate, was formed, being 60 members elected by the major council. These developments left the doge with little personal power and put actual authority in the hands of the Great Council.

In 1310, a Council of Ten was established, becoming the central political body whose members operated in secret. Around 1600, its dominance over the major council was considered a threat and efforts were made in the council and elsewhere to reduce its powers, with limited success.

In 1454, the Supreme Tribunal of the three state inquisitors was established to guard the security of the republic. By means of espionage, counterespionage, internal surveillance, and a network of informers, they ensured that Venice did not come under the rule of a single "signore", as many other Italian cities did at the time. One of the inquisitors – popularly known as Il Rosso ("the red one") because of his scarlet robe – was chosen from the doge's councillors, two – popularly known as I negri ("the black ones") because of their black robes – were chosen from the Council of Ten. The Supreme Tribunal gradually assumed some of the powers of the Council of Ten.

In 1556, the provveditori ai beni inculti were also created for the improvement of agriculture by increasing the area under cultivation and encouraging private investment in agricultural improvement. The consistent rise in the price of grain during the 16th century encouraged the transfer of capital from trade to the land.

Military

During the Medieval period, the republic's military was composed of the following elements:
Forza ordinaria (ordinary force), the oarsmen drafted from the citizens of the City of Venice; everyone from the age of 20–70 was obligated to serve in it. However, generally only a twelfth was active.
Forza sussidiaria (subsidiary force), the military force drawn from Venice's overseas possessions.
Forza straordinaria (extraordinary force), the mercenary part of the army; Venetian galleys tended to employ thirty mercenary crossbowmen. With the rise of scutage, it became the dominant element of the Venetian military.

In the early modern period, the Republic's military strength was well out of proportion with its demographic weight. In the late 16th century, it ruled over a population of about 2 million people throughout its empire. In 1571, while preparing for war against the Ottomans, the Republic had 37,000 soldiers and 140 galleys (manned by tens of thousands of sailors and oarsmen), excluding urban militias. The Venetian peacetime army strength of 9,000 was able to quadruple in the course of a few months by drawing upon professional hired soldiers and territorial militias simultaneously. These troops generally showed marked technical superiority over their primarily Turkish opponents, as demonstrated in battles such as the 18-month Siege of Famagusta, in which the Venetians inflicted outsized casualties and only were defeated when they exhausted their gunpowder. Like other states of the period, the Republic's military strength peaked during wars, only to quickly go back to peacetime levels due to costs. The level of garrisons stabilized after 1577 at 9,000, with 7,000 infantry and the rest cavalry. In 1581 there were 146 galleys and 18 galleasses in the navy, requiring a third of the Republic's revenue. During the Cretan War (1645-1669), the Republic fought mostly alone against the undivided attention of the Ottoman Empire, and though it lost, managed to keep fighting after losing 62,000 troops in the attrition, while inflicting about 240,000 losses on the Ottoman army and sinking hundreds of Ottoman ships. The cost of the war was ruinous, but the Republic was eventually able to cover it. The Morean War further confirmed the Republic's position as a military power well into the late 17th century.

Venetian military strength underwent a terminal decline in the 18th century. The combined effect of prolonged peace and the abandonment of military careers by patricians meant that Venetian military culture ossified. Its army in that period was poorly maintained. The troops, serving under non-martial officers, were not regularly drilled and worked various odd jobs to supplement their salaries. Its navy did not decline to as drastic a degree, but still never came close to its relative power in the 16th and 17th centuries. In a normal 18th century year there were about 20 ships of the line (each of 64 or 70 cannons), 10 frigates, 20 galleys, and 100 small craft, which mostly participated in patrols and punitive expeditions against Barbary corsairs. When Napoleon invaded in 1796, the Republic surrendered without a fight.

Economy

The republic of Venice was active in the production and trading of salt, salted products, and other products along trade routes established by the salt trade. Venice produced its own salt at Chioggia by the seventh century for trade, but eventually moved on to buying and establishing salt production throughout the Eastern Mediterranean. Venetian merchants bought salt and acquired salt production from Egypt, Algeria, the Crimean peninsula, Sardinia, Ibiza, Crete, and Cyprus. The establishment of these trade routes also allow Venetian merchants to pick up other valuable cargo, such as Indian spices, from these ports for trade. They then sold or supplied salt and other goods to cities in the Po Valley – Piacenza, Parma, Reggio, Bologna, among others – in exchange for salami, prosciutto, cheese, soft wheat, and other goods.

The Golden Bull of 1082, issued by Alexios I Komnenos in return for their defense of the Adriatic Sea against the Normans, granted Venetian merchants with duty-free trading rights, exempt from tax, throughout the Byzantine Empire in 23 of the most important Byzantine ports, guaranteed them property-right protections from Byzantine administrators, and given them buildings and wharfs within Constantinople. These concessions greatly expanded Venetian trading activity throughout the Eastern Mediterranean.

Heraldry

The winged Lion of St. Mark, which had appeared on the Republic's flag and coat of arms, is still featured in the red-yellow flag of the city of Venice (which has six tails, one for each sestier of the city), in the coat of arms of the city and in the yellow-red-blue flag of Veneto (which has seven tails representing the seven provinces of the region).

The winged lion also appears in the naval ensign of the Italian Republic, alongside the coat of arms of three other medieval Italian maritime republics (Genoa, Pisa, and Amalfi).

See also

References

Citations

Sources

Primary sources

 Contarini, Gasparo (1599). The Commonwealth and Government of Venice. Lewes Lewkenor, translator. London: "Imprinted by I. Windet for E. Mattes". The most important contemporary account of Venice's governance during the time of its blossoming; numerous reprint editions; online facsimile.

Secondary sources

 
 Brown, Patricia Fortini (2004). Private Lives in Renaissance Venice: art, architecture, and the family.
 Chambers, D. S. (1970). The Imperial Age of Venice, 1380–1580. London: Thames & Hudson. The best brief introduction in English, still completely reliable.
 Drechsler, Wolfgang (2002). Venice Misappropriated. Trames 6(2):192–201. A scathing review of Martin & Romano 2000; also a good summary on the most recent economic and political thought on Venice.
 Garrett, Martin (2006). Venice: a Cultural History. Revised edition of Venice: a Cultural and Literary Companion (2001).
 Grubb, James S. (1986). When Myths Lose Power: Four Decades of Venetian Historiography. Journal of Modern History 58, pp. 43–94. The classic "muckraking" essay on the myths of Venice.
 Howard, Deborah, and Sarah Quill (2004). The Architectural History of Venice.
 Hale, John Rigby (1974). Renaissance Venice. .
 
 Lane, Frederic Chapin (1973). Venice: Maritime Republic. . A standard scholarly history with an emphasis on economic, political and diplomatic history.
 Laven, Mary (2002). Virgins of Venice: Enclosed Lives and Broken Vows in the Renaissance Convent. The most important study of the life of Renaissance nuns, with much on aristocratic family networks and the life of women more generally.
 Mallett, M. E. and Hale, J. R. (1984). The Military Organisation of a Renaissance State, Venice c. 1400 to 1617. .
 Martin, John Jeffries and Dennis Romano (eds.) (2002). Venice Reconsidered: The History and Civilization of an Italian City-State, 1297–1797. Johns Hopkins UP. The most recent collection on essays, many by prominent scholars, on Venice.
 Melisseides Ioannes A. (2010), E epibiose:odoiporiko se chronus meta ten Alose tes Basileusas (1453–1605 peripu), (in Greek), epim.Pulcheria Sabolea-Melisseide, Ekd.Vergina Athens, (WorldCat, Greek National Bibliography 9217/10, Regesta Imperii, etc.), p. 91–108, 
 Muir, Edward (1981). Civic Ritual in Renaissance Venice. Princeton UP. The classic of Venetian cultural studies, highly sophisticated.
 
 Prelli, Alberto. Sotto le bandiere di San Marco, le armate della Serenissima nel '600, Itinera Progetti, Bassano del Grappa, 2012
 Romanin, Samuele (1853), Storia documentata di Venezia, vol. 1, Venice, Pietro Naratovich tipografo editore.
 Rosand, David (2001). Myths of Venice: The Figuration of a State. How foreign writers have understood Venice and its art.
 Tafuri, Manfredo (1995). Venice and the Renaissance. On Venetian architecture.
 Tafel, Gottlieb Lukas Friedrich, and Georg Martin Thomas (1856). Urkunden zur älteren Handels- und Staatsgeschichte der Republik Venedig .
 Tomaz, Luigi (2007). Il confine d'Italia in Istria e Dalmazia. Foreword by Arnaldo Mauri. Conselve: Think ADV.
 Tomaz, Luigi. In Adriatico nel secondo millennio. Foreword by Arnaldo Mauri.
 Tomaz, Luigi (2001). In Adriatico nell'antichità e nell'alto medioevo. Foreword by Arnaldo Mauri. Conselve: Think ADV.

External links 

 Geschichte Venedigs. Politik 
 Sources for the history of the Republic of Venice 
 Interactive map of venetian fortresses & fortified villages in Greece and Aegean sea

 
Former republics
Maritime republics
Republic of Venice
History of the Adriatic Sea
History of the Mediterranean
History of the Balkans
1st millennium in Italy
States and territories established in 697
Venice
Republic of Venice

Republic of Venice
Republic of Venice
Italian city-states
Italian states
Christian states